"Cough Cough" is a song from British indie pop band Everything Everything. The track was released in the United Kingdom on 14 October 2012 as the lead single from the band's second studio album, Arc (2013).

Reception

Critical reception
Tom Howard of NME praised the track, commenting "Yeah… so… um… wait a second go Everything Everything like the shy and polite young chaps they are. But then they break into a Dirty-Projectors-crossed with-Destiny’s-Child thing that makes you wish they'd go on a two-year hiatus and make comebacks all the bloody time. Suddenly they sound like saviours of music". "Cough Cough" was also met with positive reception from Doron Davidson-Vidavski of Londonist, who noted it as a "manic and wonderful track [which] highlights all that is unique about the quartet: choppy song structures, hectic vocals and hooksome melodies." The song reached #100 on Triple J Hottest 100 of 2012.

Chart performance
For the chart week dated 27 October 2012, "Cough Cough" debuted at number thirty-seven on the UK Singles Chart—marking the band's first top forty entry—beating previous highest-charting single "My Kz, Ur Bf" (#121, 2010). The following week, "Cough Cough" fell twenty-two places to number fifty-nine; marking its second and final week within the top one hundred.

Track listing

Charts

Credits and personnel
Recording and mixing
Recorded at RAK Studios, London; Angelic Studios, Halse; Muttley Ranch, London; Jonathan's Flat, Manchester; mixed at Muttley Ranch, London.

Personnel

Songwriting - Jonathan Higgs
Production - David Kosten, Everything Everything
Recording - Mo Hauseler, Tom A.D. Fuller, David Kosten
Assistant Engineering - Mike Horner, Pete Prokopiw

Mixing - David Kosten
Mastering - John Davis (at Metropolis Mastering)
Instrumenting - Jonathan Higgs, Jeremy Pritchard, Alex Robertshaw, Michael Spearman
Coughing - Mike Carswell, David Kosten

Credits adapted from the liner notes of Arc, RCA Records, UMP.

Release history

References

2012 songs
2012 singles
Everything Everything songs
Songs written by Jonathan Higgs
RCA Records singles